Piple may refer to:

Piple, Kosi, Nepal
Piple, Narayani, Nepal